Anzaldo Municipality is the second municipal section of the Esteban Arce Province in the Cochabamba Department, Bolivia. Its seat is Anzaldo. At the time of census 2001 the municipality had 9,126 inhabitants.

Subdivision 
Anzaldo Municipality is divided into three cantons.

Languages 
The languages spoken in the Anzaldo Municipality are mainly Quechua and Spanish.

See also 
 Jatun Mayu
 Jaya Mayu
 Misuk'ani
 Puka Qawiña

References

External links 
 Map of Esteban Arce Province

Municipalities of the Cochabamba Department